Elizabeth Hosking (born July 22, 2001) is a Canadian snowboarder, competing in the discipline of half-pipe.

Career

Olympics
In January 2018, Hosking was named to Canada's 2018 Olympic team, placing 19th in the halfpipe competition. Hosking was the youngest member of the team.

In January 2022, Hosking was named to Canada's 2022 Olympic team.

References

2001 births
Living people
Canadian female snowboarders
Sportspeople from Longueuil
Snowboarders at the 2018 Winter Olympics
Snowboarders at the 2022 Winter Olympics
Olympic snowboarders of Canada
X Games athletes